The Grey Lady, also known as Sherlock Holmes, is a 1937 German mystery film directed by Erich Engels and starring Hermann Speelmans, Trude Marlen and Elisabeth Wendt.

Cast
Hermann Speelmans as Jimmy Ward (Sherlock Holmes)
Trude Marlen as Maria Iretzkaja
Elisabeth Wendt as Lola
Edwin Jürgensen as J.v. Barnov
Theo Shall as Harry Morrel
Ernst Karchow as Inspector Brown
Werner Finck as John, Diener bei Ward
Werner Scharf as Jack Clark
Hans Halden as James Hewitt
Henry Lorenzen as Archibald Pepperkorn
Reinhold Bernt as Wilson
Eva Tinschmann as Frau Miller
Ursula Herking
Maria Loja
Charles Willy Kayser
Paul Schwed
Siegfried Weiß as Ganove

References

External links

1937 mystery films
German mystery films
Films of Nazi Germany
Films directed by Erich Engels
German black-and-white films
Sherlock Holmes films
Terra Film films
1930s German films
1930s German-language films